Joseph Clay (October 16, 1741 – November 15, 1804) was an American military officer and politician from Georgia.

Born in England, he immigrated to the United States and in 1760 settled in Savannah, Georgia. During the American Revolution, he served on the local council of safety and was a delegate to the Georgia Provincial Congress in 1775. He was a major in the Georgia Line of the Continental Army during the War of Independence. He was  appointed by the Continental Congress as deputy paymaster general in Georgia with the rank of colonel on August 6, 1777. He was elected to the Continental Congress in 1778, but did not attend. He died in 1804. He was the father of Joseph Clay Jr. and the grandfather of William Henry Stiles, Henry Harford Cumming, and Alfred Cumming.

References

External links

1741 births
1804 deaths
American slave owners
Continental Army officers from Georgia (U.S. state)
People of Georgia (U.S. state) in the American Revolution